Pirita is a subdistrict in the district of Pirita, Tallinn, the capital of Estonia. It is located around the estuary of the Pirita River to the Tallinn Bay. The subdistrict has a population of 960. Pirita was selected as the venue of the sailing events for the 1980 summer Olympics. During the preparations for the Olympics, sports buildings were built in Tallinn including the Pirita Yachting Centre and the Hotel Olümpia.

Pirita District Administration

District Elder Tõnis Liinat

Gallery

See also
Kloostrimets

Pirita Beach
Pirita Convent
Pirita-Kose-Kloostrimetsa Circuit
Pirita River
Pirita Velodrome
Pirita Yachting Centre

References

External link

Subdistricts of Tallinn